Vitória Futebol Clube do Riboque (Forro language: Viˈtɔɾiɐ Futɨˈbɔɫˈ Klub(ɨ) du Ribɔk) is a football club that plays in the São Tomé and Príncipe Championship.The club is most noted for the fact that they are the São Tomé and Príncipe one of  oldest club, founded 1976.  The team is based in Riboque a neighbourhood of city São Tomé in the Água Grande District on the island of São Tomé. Its offices are located at Avenida Geovany in Riboque.  The club is the only unrelegated club in the island of São Tomé. Vitória Riboque is historically the third successful football (soccer) club in both São Tomé Island and São Tomé and Príncipe, having won about 25 official titles, 14 are national and the remaining 11 are regional titles. In national championship titles, they have five, about 15% of the championship title totals, by district, half of the titles won. Of the regional titles, about 30% of the totals, by district, more than half of the totals. In cup titles it totals about 30% of the national titles.

History
The team has won five national championship titles and seven local titles.  Their first was also the first in the nation to win a title after independence in 1977 and the first team ever to win the first three titles in a row, until 1980, it was the only club who won national titles and from Água Grande.  Their last title was won in 2011. Vitória once possessed the most titles regionally and nationally until 2013 when Sporting Praia Cruz shared it, in 2015 the club became second to possess the most titles behind Sporting Praia Cruz. The team  also won the first five titles in the same year and won six cup titles, their first was in 1984 and their last was in 2011 and the club has the most national cup titles won.

The club celebrated its 10th anniversary in 1986 and its 25th anniversary in 2001.

Jersey
Its jersey features a striped green shirt with green sleeves and white socks.

About the club
The name is identical to its fathering club, the Portuguese Vitória de Setúbal.  It is the only club in the nation that is affiliated to Vitória Setúbal, other affiliates in Africa, one example is Vitória de Santiago (or FC de Praia) based in Cape Verde and Vitória FC de Luanda in Angola.

Stadium
Estádio Nacional 12 de Julho is a multi-use stadium in São Tomé, São Tomé and Príncipe.  It is currently used mostly for football matches.  The stadium holds 6,500.  Its address is Avenidas das Nações Unidas.  The stadium is home to the three best football clubs in the nation and the island including Sporting Praia Cruz, Aliança Nacional. Andorinha and Vitória Riboque

The club also trains and practices at the stadium.

Honours
National:
São Tomé and Príncipe Championships: 5
1977, 1978, 1979, 1986, 1989
Taça Nacional de São Tomé e Principe: 8
1984, 1985, 1986, 1989, 1990, 1999, 2007, 2011
São Tomé and Príncipe Super Cup: 1
2011

Regional:
São Tomé Island League: 6
1977, 1978, 1979, 1986, 1989, 2011
Taça Regional de São Tomé: 5
1985, 1986, 2001, 2007, 2011

Seasons

Season to season

6  seasons on 1st place.
13 seasons on 2nd place.
6  seasons on 3rd place.
2  seasons  on 4th place.
1  season  on 5th place.
1  season  on 7th place.

League and cup history

Statistics
Best position: 1st (national)
Best position at cup competitions: 1st (national)
Appearances at a Super cup competition: 
Appearances:
National: 6
Regional: 32
Appearance at a national cup competition: 8

References

External links
 Vitória FC Riboque site official
 Vitória FC Riboque at the Final Ball
 Vitória FC Riboque 2013–14

 
Football clubs in São Tomé and Príncipe
São Tomé Island Premier Division
Sport in São Tomé
1976 establishments in São Tomé and Príncipe
Association football clubs established in 1976